The Chimney Sweepers Act 1875 was an Act of the Parliament of the United Kingdom that superseded the Chimney Sweepers and Chimneys Regulation Act 1840 passed to try to stop child labour. The Bills proposed by Lord Shaftesbury, triggered by the death of twelve-year-old George Brewster whose master had caused him to climb and clean the chimney at Fulbourn Hospital.

The Chimney Sweepers Act 1875 was repealed for England and Wales by section 1(1) of the Chimney Sweepers Acts (Repeal) Act 1938 (1 & 2 Geo 6 c 58).

The 1840 Act prohibited any person under 21 being compelled or knowingly allowed to ascend or descend a chimney or flue for sweeping, cleaning or coring. This Act ensured all chimney-sweeps would be registered with the police, and that official supervision of their work would take place. The provisions of all previous acts would now take place.

Further reading 
"The Chimney Sweepers Act 1875". Halsbury's Statutes. (The Complete Statutes of England). First Edition. Butterworth & Co (Publishers) Limited. 1930. Volume 13. Pages 784 et seq. See also pages 479 and 870.
"Chimney Sweepers Act 1875". Education in England. (Derek Gillard).

References
Notes

Bibliography

United Kingdom Acts of Parliament 1875
United Kingdom labour law
Child labour law
1875 in labor relations
Chimney sweeps